Vemireddy Prabhakar Reddy is the founder of VPR Mining Infra Pvt. Ltd. He is also a member of the YSR Congress Party and an elected Member of parliament Rajya Sabha for the biennial elections held in March 2018. He started Vemireddy Prabhakar Reddy Foundation (VPR Foundation) in 2015 at Nellore, Andhra Pradesh and was doing different social activities in the name VPR Vikas, VPR Vidya  and VPR Vaidya.

References

Indian company founders
1956 births
Living people